Ruth Edna Kelley (8 April 1893 – 4 March 1982) was an American librarian and writer. She is chiefly remembered for The Book of Hallowe'en (1919), the first book-length history of the holiday.

Biography 
Kelley was born in Massachusetts, the only child of Charles F. Kelley, a carpenter, and his wife Mary. She grew up in Lynn, Massachusetts, and received a master of arts degree.

The Book of Hallowe'en was Kelly's first book. Her second book, A Life of Their Own (1947), dealt with immortality and spirituality.

Kelley died in Marblehead, Massachusetts at the age of 88.

Further reading
 
 Who Was Who Among North American Authors, 1921-1939. Detroit: Gale Research, 1976.
 Who's Who in Library Service: A Biographical Directory of Professional Librarians of the United States and Canada. Third edition. Edited by Dorothy Ethlyn Cole. New York: Grolier Society, 1955.

References

External links

 
 
 

1893 births
1982 deaths
American librarians
American women librarians
20th-century American historians
People from Marblehead, Massachusetts
American women historians
20th-century American women writers
Historians from Massachusetts